Kentucky Route 58 (KY 58) is a  state highway in Kentucky that runs from a dead end near Columbus to U.S. Route 68 (US 68) near Briensburg, Kentucky via Columbus, Clinton, Mayfield, and Benton.

History

Kentucky Route 58 was part of the initial Commonwealth of Kentucky highway numbering plan developed in the early 1920s as a primary east–west route through far western Kentucky.  The original route began at Kentucky Route 93 in Eddyville in Lyon County and immediately crossed the Cumberland River via ferry.  The route exited Lyon County via a ferry over the Tennessee River into Marshall County at Birmingham and continued west to Briensburg where it joined its modern-day eastern terminus.  The route continued via its modern-day route through Benton, Mayfield and Clinton.  The route exited Kentucky via a ferry over the Lower Mississippi River at Columbus into Missouri. 

.

Major intersections

References

0058
Transportation in Hickman County, Kentucky
Transportation in Graves County, Kentucky
Transportation in Marshall County, Kentucky